Pisodonophis semicinctus is an eel in the family Ophichthidae (worm/snake eels). First described by John Richardson in 1848., it is a marine, subtropical eel which is known in the eastern Atlantic Ocean from Gibraltar to Angola. It dwells at a depth range of 10 to 30 m and inhabits the continental shelf, where it forms burrows in sand and mud. Males can reach a maximum total length of 80 cm, but more commonly reach a TL of 60 cm.

P. semicinctus is of commercial interest to fisheries. Its diet consists of mollusks and benthic crustaceans.

References

Ophichthidae
Fish described in 1848